All Is Always Now – Live at The Stone is a 2019 three-CD box set of live improvised music performed by English guitarist Fred Frith with other musicians, including Theresa Wong, Ikue Mori, Pauline Oliveros and Laurie Anderson. It was recorded between 2007 and 2016 at The Stone in New York City, and was released in March 2019 by Intakt Records in Switzerland.

Frith performed in 80 concerts at The Stone between 2006 and 2016 and Intakt called this collection "A decade-long adventure in improvisation". The titles of the songs are derived from The New York Times headlines on the day of each performance. The box set's liner notes are a 24-page booklet written by Frith, which includes an interview with Frith conducted by one of the performers, Theresa Wong. Remarking on this collection, Wong said:
I was struck by the musicality. What I mean by that is: there's this presence of songs and song forms – the music can be harmonic and melodic, there's noise, there's rhythm, a joyfulness, an exploration, a sensuality of sounds, but always underlining that is a musicality that feels to me like songs.

Reception
Reviewing All Is Always Now in NZZ am Sonntag, the weekend edition of the Swiss newspaper Neue Zürcher Zeitung, Manfred Papst referred to Frith as a "wild guy" (wilder Kerl) who loves to experiment with noise and sound. He called the selection of concerts from The Stone featured on this triple-CD "a sensation", and was surprised at just how many different styles of music Frith and his collaborators play.

Writing in The New York City Jazz Record, Mark Keresman described the sounds in the box set as an assortment of "jubilant [and] whimsical noise", "droning" and "song-like tapestries". The found and homemade instruments Frith and Tewari use on their tracks produce "a roughhewn, amiably dissonant collage of sonic shards (dis)assembled for the sheer joy of it". Keresman said some of the pieces sound like "the soundtrack to a movie thriller yet to be made". On "Evidence" Frith and Anderson produce notes that "build and release tension" like "an Ennio Morricone film score".

Georges Tonla Briquet remarked on the Belgian jazz website, JazzHalo that the only thread linking the collection's diverse tracks is that the music is completely unrehearsed and improvised. He said while there is plenty of noise and unusual sounds, there are many quiet and delicate sections. He found it "claustrophobic" at times, but also "surprisingly transparent". Briquet added that the album is long and even "seasoned fans" may find it a little excessive.

Track listing
All titles performed at The Stone on the dates indicated; all titles composed by the performers.

Sources: Liner notes, Intakt Records, Discogs.

Personnel
Fred Frith – piano (track 1.1), home-made instruments (tracks 1.5, 2.1, 2.6, 3.7), acoustic guitar and voice (tracks 2.2, 2.5), electric guitar (all other tracks)
Nava Dunkelman – percussion
Amma Ateria – electronics
Jason Hoopes – electric bass (track 1.2), double bass (track 3.1)
Jordan Glenn – drums
Jessica Lurie – alto saxophone
Theresa Wong – cello, voice, electronics
Annie Lewandowski – piano
Ikue Mori – electronics
Nate Wooley – trumpet
Sudhu Tewari – recuperated junk
Pauline Oliveros – re-tuned accordion
Else Olson Storesund – prepared piano
Sylvie Courvoisier – piano
Shelley Hirsch – voice
Clara Weil – voice
Evan Parker – saxophone
Laurie Anderson – violin, keyboards, electronics
Gyan Riley – electric guitar
Miya Masaoka – koto, electronics

Sound and artwork
Recorded at The Stone, New York City between 2007 and 2016. Mixed at Jankowski SoundFabrik, Esslingen, Germany on February 27, 28 and March 1, 2018.
Ben Young – recording engineer (track 2.7)
Joe Lizzi – recording engineer (track 2.7)
Shane Brown – recording engineer (tracks 2.3, 2.6, 3.3, 3.6)
Else Olsen Storesund – recording engineer using a video camera (tracks 2.2, 2.5)
Jeremiah Cymerman – recording engineer (all other tracks)
Peter Hardt – creative engineer (mixing, enhancing)
Fred Frith – liner notes
Jonas Schoder – graphic design
Heike Liss – photography

Sources: Liner notes, Intakt Records, Discogs.

Footnotes

References

External links
All Is Always Now at Intakt Records
All Is Always Now reviews at Intakt Records

2019 live albums
Fred Frith live albums
Live free improvisation albums